The World Cup of Hockey is an international ice hockey tournament. Inaugurated in 1996, it is the successor to the Canada Cup, which was held every 3 to 5 years from 1976 to 1991 and was the first international hockey championship to allow nations to field their top players. The World Cup has occurred thrice before on an irregular basis, with the United States winning in 1996 and Canada winning in 2004 and 2016. Following the 2016 tournament, it is uncertain if the series will be continued, after the cancellation of the 2020 tournament. The NHL will attempt to hold the next edition of the World Cup in 2025.

The World Cup of Hockey is organized by the National Hockey League (NHL) and the National Hockey League Players' Association (NHLPA), unlike the annual Ice Hockey World Championships and quadrennial Olympic tournament, both run by the International Ice Hockey Federation (IIHF). World Cup games are played under NHL rules and not those of the IIHF, and the tournament occurs prior to the NHL pre-season, allowing all the NHL's players to be available, unlike the World Championships, which overlaps with the NHL's Stanley Cup playoffs.

History

Canada Cup

The World Cup of Hockey was preceded by the Canada Cup, which began in 1976 in a combined effort from Doug Fisher of Hockey Canada and Alan Eagleson of the NHL Players' Association. Taking inspiration from soccer's FIFA World Cup, Eagleson proposed a new tournament that would bring together all the top hockey–playing nations. After successful negotiations with hockey officials from the Soviet Union in September 1974, Eagleson began arranging the Canada Cup tournament, which debuted in 1976. It was the first international ice hockey tournament that allowed hockey nations to field their top players, as the Winter Olympics was a strictly amateur competition and the annual World Championships clashed with the Stanley Cup playoffs.

The tournaments, held every three to five years, took place in North American venues prior to the start of the National Hockey League (NHL) regular season. Six teams competed in each edition. Of the five Canada Cup tournaments, four were won by Canada, while the Soviet Union won one, that being in 1981.

World Cup of Hockey

In 1996, the Canada Cup was officially replaced by the World Cup of Hockey. The Canada Cup trophy was retired. The tournament expanded to eight teams: as the national teams of Canada, United States, Czech Republic, Finland, Russia and Sweden, popularly dubbed as the Big Six, were joined by Germany and Slovakia. The United States defeated Canada to win the inaugural event.

Eight years later, the second installment of the World Cup of Hockey took place in 2004, just prior to the 2004–05 NHL lockout. Canada won its first tournament championship, defeating the Czech Republic in the semifinals and Finland in the final match.

On January 24, 2015, NHL commissioner Gary Bettman announced the 2016 World Cup of Hockey to be held in September 2016 at Air Canada Centre in Toronto. The 2016 edition featured a slightly modified format: alongside the Big Six countries, there were two all-star teams, consisting of Team Europe and an under-23 Team North America.  Canada again won the championship, defeating Team Europe in the finals.

The 2020 edition was planned to include a European qualification tournament to determine some participating nations. In January 2019, plans for the tournament were abandoned due to the pending expiration of the collective bargaining agreement (CBA) between the NHL and the NHL Players' Association. In August 2019, it was reported that a World Cup could take place in February 2021 if the CBA could be extended or renewed; however, this was ruled-out by the NHL later that year. The league will attempt to hold the next edition of the World Cup in 2025.

Trophy
In 2004, Canadian American architect Frank Gehry designed a new trophy for the tournament. It is made from a composite alloy of copper and nickel as well as solid cast urethane plastic. The trophy was criticized by the sports community, noting the Toronto Sun's headline "What is that?"

Tournaments

Titles

(*) Host

See also

 List of international ice hockey competitions featuring NHL players
 1972 Summit Series
 1974 Summit Series
 Ice hockey at the Olympic Games
 Rendez-vous '87

References

 Müller, Stephan : International Ice Hockey Encyclopedia 1904-2005 / BoD GmbH Norderstedt, 2005 

 
Ice hockey tournaments
Recurring sporting events established in 1996
World cups in winter sports